The 2011 Chrono des Nations was the 30th edition of the Chrono des Nations cycle race and was held on 16 October 2011. The race started and finished in Les Herbiers. The race was won by Tony Martin.

General classification

References

2011
2011 in road cycling
2011 in French sport
October 2011 sports events in France